Ocice may refer to the following places in Poland:
Ocice in Gmina Bolesławiec, Lower Silesian Voivodeshi
 Ocice (Racibórz), in Racibórz district
 Ocice (Tarnobrzeg), in Tarnobrzeg district
 Ocice (stacja kolejowa), railway station in Ocice (Tarnobrzeg)